Aryaman Vikram Birla Institute of Learning is an English medium co-educational day school located in the city of Haldwani, Uttarakhand.

Aryaman Vikram Birla Institute of Learning was established on 30 March 2004 by renowned industrialist Mr. B.K. Birla and Late Mrs. Sarla Birla. It has a large campus of 15 acres and more than 80 teachers.

Affiliation & Certification
The school is affiliated to the Central Board of Secondary Education, New Delhi.

Academics

Core subjects include
Languages - English (compulsory), Hindi and/or Sanskrit,
Mathematics,
Science (Physics, Chemistry and Biology),
Social Studies (History, Civics, Geography, Economics),
Life skills,
Health Education,
Computer Science,
French

Subjects offered in classes XI - XII
Science Stream:
Optional - Informatics Practices / Computer Science / Hindi / Economics(any one)
English,
Physics,
Chemistry,
Mathematics / Biology,
Physical Education.

Commerce Stream:
Optional- Informatics Practices / Mathematics/ Computer Science / Hindi(any one)
English,
Accountancy,
Business Studies,
Economics,
Physical Education

Humanities Stream:
Optional - Informatics Practices / Mathematics/ Computer Science / Hindi (any one)
English,
History,
Geography,
Economics,
Physical Education

Co-curricular Activities 
The school offers the following co-curricular activities:

 Art and craft
 Dance and dramatics
 Vocal and instrumental music
 Creative writing 
 Debating

Sports 
The school provides coaching in games like Pool, Lawn Tennis, Table Tennis, Badminton, Kho-Kho, Cricket, Football, Basketball, Volleyball, Hockey, Handball, Athletics and Tae-kwon-do.

References

Primary schools in India
High schools and secondary schools in Uttarakhand
Haldwani-Kathgodam
Educational institutions established in 2004
2004 establishments in Uttarakhand